Education and Youth Affairs Bureau was the education agency of Macau. It merged with the Higher Education Bureau, becoming the Education and Youth Development Bureau, in 2021.

Head Office Location
Its head office is in Sé (Cathedral Parish).

References

External links
 Education and Youth Affairs Bureau
 Education and Youth Affairs Bureau (In Portuguese)
 Education and Youth Affairs Bureau (In Traditional Chinese)
 Education and Youth Affairs Bureau (In Simplified Chinese)

Education ministries
Government departments and agencies of Macau
Education in China
2021 disestablishments in China
Educational institutions disestablished in 2021